The 2012-13 season of the FA Women's Premier League was the 21st season of the former top flight of English women's association football.

National Division

Northern Division

Southern Division

References

full-time.thefa

Eng
women
FA Women's National League seasons
2